Malvaceae, or the mallows, is a family of flowering plants estimated to contain 244 genera with 4225 known species. Well-known members of economic importance include okra, cotton, cacao and durian. There are also some genera containing familiar ornamentals, such as Alcea (hollyhock), Malva (mallow), and Tilia (lime or linden tree). The largest genera in terms of number of species include Hibiscus (300 species), Sterculia (250 species), Dombeya (250 species), Pavonia (200 species) and Sida (200 species).

Taxonomy and nomenclature

The circumscription of the Malvaceae is controversial. The traditional Malvaceae sensu stricto comprise a very homogeneous and cladistically monophyletic group. Another major circumscription, Malvaceae sensu lato, has been more recently defined on the basis that genetics studies have shown the commonly recognised families Bombacaceae, Tiliaceae, and Sterculiaceae, which have always been considered closely allied to Malvaceae s.s., are not monophyletic groups. Thus, the Malvaceae can be expanded to include all of these families so as to compose a monophyletic group. Adopting this circumscription, the Malvaceae incorporate a much larger number of genera.

Subfamilies
This article is based on the second circumscription, as presented by the Angiosperm Phylogeny Website. The Malvaceae s.l. (hereafter simply "Malvaceae") comprise nine subfamilies. A tentative cladogram of the family is shown below. The diamond denotes a poorly supported branching (<80%).

Until recently, relationships between these subfamilies were either poorly supported or almost completely obscure. Continuing disagreements focused primarily on the correct circumscription of these subfamilies, including the preservation of the family Bombacaceae. A study published in 2021 presented a fully resolved phylogenetic framework for Malvaceae s.l. using genomic data for all nine subfamilies.

Regarding the traditional Malvaceae s.s., the subfamily Malvoideae approximately corresponds to that group.

Synapomorphies 
The relationships between the "core Malvales" families used to be defined on the basis of shared "malvean affinities".  These included the presence of malvoid teeth, stems with mucilage canals, and stratified wedge-shaped phloem. These affinities were problematic because they were not always shared within the core families. Later studies revealed more unambiguous synapomorphies within Malvaceae s.l..  Synapomorphies identified within Malvaceae s.l. include the presence of tile cells, trichomatous nectaries, and an inflorescence structure called a bicolor unit. Tile cells consist of vertically positioned cells interspersed between and dimensionally similar to procumbent ray cells. Evidence of Malvean wood fossils has confirmed their evolutionary link in Malvaceae s.l., as well as explained their diverse structures. Flowers of Malvaceae s.l. exhibit nectaries consisting of densely arranged multicellular hairs resembling trichomes. In most of Malvaceae s.l., these trichomatous nectaries are located on the inner surface of the sepals, but flowers of the subfamily Tiliodeae also have present nectaries on the petals. Malvean flowers also share a unifying structure known as a bicolor unit, named for its initial discovery in the flowers of Theobroma bicolor. The bicolor unit consists of an ordered inflorescence with determinate cymose structures. The inflorescence can branch off the main axis, creating separate orders of the flowers, with the main axis developing first. Bracts on the peduncle subtend axillary buds that become these lateral stalks. One bract within this whorl is a sterile bract. The bicolor unit is a variable structure in complexity, but the presence of fertile and sterile bracts is a salient characteristic.

Names
The English common name 'mallow' (also applied to other members of Malvaceae) comes from Latin malva (also the source for the English word "mauve"). Malva itself was ultimately derived from the word for the plant in ancient Mediterranean languages.

Description

Most species are herbaceous plants or shrubs, but some are trees or lianas.

Leaves and stems

Leaves are generally alternate, often palmately lobed or compound and palmately veined. The margin may be entire, but when dentate, a vein ends at the tip of each tooth (malvoid teeth). Stipules are present. The stems contain mucous canals and often also mucous cavities. Hairs are common, and are most typically stellate. Stems of Bombacoideae are often covered in thick prickles.

Flowers

The flowers are commonly borne in definite or indefinite axillary inflorescences, which are often reduced to a single flower, but may also be cauliflorous, oppositifolious, or terminal. They often bear supernumerary bracts in the structure of a bicolor unit. They can be unisexual or bisexual, and are generally actinomorphic, often associated with conspicuous bracts, forming an epicalyx. They generally have five valvate sepals, most frequently basally connate, with five imbricate petals. The stamens are five to numerous, and connate at least at their bases, but often forming a tube around the pistils. The pistils are composed of two to many connate carpels. The ovary is superior, with axial placentation, with capitate or lobed stigma. 
The flowers have nectaries made of many tightly packed glandular hairs, usually positioned on the sepals.

Fruits

The fruits are most often loculicidal capsules, schizocarps or nuts.

Pollination
Self-pollination is often avoided by means of protandry. Most species are entomophilous (pollinated by insects). Bees from the tribe Emphorini of the Apidae (including Ptilothrix, Diadasia, and Melitoma) are known to specialize on the plants.

Importance
A number of species are pests in agriculture, including Abutilon theophrasti and Modiola caroliniana, and others that are garden escapees. Cotton (four species of Gossypium), kenaf (Hibiscus cannabinus), cacao (Theobroma cacao), kola nut (Cola spp.), and okra (Abelmoschus esculentus) are important agricultural crops. The fruit and leaves of baobabs are edible, as is the fruit of the durian. A number of species, including Hibiscus syriacus, Hibiscus rosa-sinensis and Alcea rosea are garden plants.

See also
 Florissantia, an extinct Cenozoic genus in the subfamily Sterculioidea

References

 
 
 
 Bayer, C. and K. Kubitzki 2003. Malvaceae, pp. 225–311. In K. Kubitzki (ed.), The Families and Genera of Vascular Plants, vol. 5, Malvales, Capparales and non-betalain Caryophyllales.
 
 
 Maas, P. J. M. and L. Y. Th. Westra. 2005. Neotropical Plant Families (3rd edition).
 
  (abstract online here).

External links

 Malvaceae.info: Malvaceae Gallery
 Topwalks.net: Malvaceae
 Tree of Life.org: Core Malvales
 HEAR.org — Malvaceae: plants of Hawaii — image gallery.
 GREIF Flora: Malvaceae of Mongolia

 
Malvales families